Rowing at the 2007 Pan American Games took place at the Lagoa Rodrigo de Freitas, the same venue that hosted the Canoe and Kayak and Water Skiing events. Although the initial intention of the Organizing Committee was to have the whole Olympic Program at the Pan American Games, the Women's Eight was not held due to lack of participants.

Medal summary

Men's events

Women's events

Medals table

References
 Results

 
Rowing at the Pan American Games
2007 in rowing
Events at the 2007 Pan American Games
Rowing competitions in Brazil